Mingrelian or Megrelian is a Kartvelian language spoken in Western Georgia (regions of Mingrelia and Abkhazia), primarily by the Mingrelians. The language was also called kolkhuri (Georgian ) in the early 20th century. Mingrelian has historically been only a regional language within the boundaries of historical Georgian states and then modern Georgia, and the number of younger people speaking it has decreased substantially, with UNESCO designating it as a "definitely endangered language".

Distribution and status
No reliable figure exists for the number of native speakers of Mingrelian, but it is estimated to be between 300,000 and 500,000. Most speakers live in the Mingrelia (or Samegrelo and formerly Odishi) region of Georgia, which comprises the Odishi Hills and the Kolkheti Lowlands, from the Black Sea coast to the Svan Mountains and the Tskhenistskali River. Smaller enclaves existed in Abkhazia, but the ongoing civil unrest there has displaced many Mingrelian speakers to other regions of Georgia. Their geographical distribution is relatively compact, which has helped to promote the transmission of the language between generations.

Mingrelian is generally written in the Georgian alphabet, but it has no written standard or official status. Almost all speakers are bilingual; they use Mingrelian mainly for familiar and informal conversation, and Georgian (or, for expatriate speakers, the local official language) for other purposes.

History
Mingrelian is one of the Kartvelian languages. It is closely related to Laz, from which it has become differentiated mostly in the past 500 years, after the northern (Mingrelian) and southern (Laz) communities were separated by Turkic invasions. It is less closely related to Georgian, the two branches having separated in the first millennium BC or earlier, and even more distantly related to Svan, which is believed to have branched off in the 2nd millennium BC or earlier. Mingrelian is mutually intelligible only with Laz.

Some linguists refer to Mingrelian and Laz as Zan languages. Zan had already split into Mingrelian and Laz variants by early modern times, however, and it is not customary to speak of a unified Zan language today.

The oldest surviving texts in Mingrelian date from the 19th century, and are mainly items of ethnographical literature. The earliest linguistic studies of Mingrelian include a phonetic analysis by Aleksandre Tsagareli (1880), and grammars by Ioseb Kipshidze (1914) and Shalva Beridze (1920). From 1930 to 1938 several newspapers were published in Mingrelian, such as Kazakhishi Gazeti, Komuna, Samargalosh Chai, Narazenish Chai, and Samargalosh Tutumi. More recently, there has been some revival of the language, with the publication of a Mingrelian–Georgian dictionary by Otar Kajaia, a Mingrelian-German dictionary by Otar Kajaia and Heinz Fähnrich, and books of poems by Lasha Gakharia, Edem Izoria, Lasha Gvasalia, Guri Otobaia, Giorgi Sichinava, Jumber Kukava, and Vakhtang Kharchilava, journal Skani, Mingrelian wikipedia, as well as books and magazines published by Jehovah's Witnesses.

Phonology

Vowels
Mingrelian has five primary vowels a, e, i, o, u. The Zugdidi-Samurzaqano dialect has a sixth, ə, which is the result of reduction of i and u.

Consonants
The consonant inventory of Mingrelian is almost identical to that of Laz, Georgian, and Svan.

Phonetic processes

Vowel reduction
Certain pairs of vowels reduce to single vowels:
ae and ai → ee → e
ao, oa and oo → aa → a
ou → uu → u

In Zugdidi-Samurzaqano dialect the vowels i and u also often reduce to ə.

Pre-consonant change of velar g
Before consonants, g → r.

====Positional change of uvular q''' sound====
In word-initial prevocalic and intervocalic positions, q' → ʔ. Before the consonant v, q' → ɔ/ǩ.

Regressive assimilation of consonants
The common types are:
voicing/devoicing of voiceless/voiced consonants before voiced/voiceless ones (respectively).
glottalization of consonants before the glottalized ones and the glottal stop.

Progressive dissimilation
If the stem contains r then the suffixes -ar and -ur transform to -al and -ul, e.g.  (Khorga, the village)→  ("Khorgan").
The rule is not valid if in the stem with r an l appears later, e.g.  ("Martvili", the town) →  (adj. "Martvilian")In a stem with voiceless affricates or voiceless sibilants, a later ǯ is deaffricated to d, e.g.  →  "comb",  →  "fly (insect)",  →  "arrow", etc.

The transformation of l
in all dialects of Mingrelian, before consonants l → r.
in the Martvili subdialect in word-initial prevocalic position, l  → y  → ∅ and in intervocalic position l → ∅ 

Intervocalic deletion of v
Between the vowels the organic v disappears, e.g.  (Geo. "abundance, plenty") →  →  (id.),  (Geo. "raceme") →  (id.), etc.

Phonetic augmentation n
Before the stops and affricates, an inorganic augmentation n may appear (before labials n → m).

Alphabet
Mingrelian is written in the Mkhedruli script.

Grammar

Dialects
The main dialects and subdialects of Mingrelian are:

 Zugdidi-Samurzakano or Northwest dialect
 Dzhvari
 Senaki or Southeast dialect
 Martvili-Bandza
 Abasha

Famous speakers
Lavrenti Beria, Soviet leader Joseph Stalin's chief of secret police
Konstantine Gamsakhurdia, one of the most influential Georgian writers of the 20th century
Zviad Gamsakhurdia, first president of post-Soviet Georgia
Antisa Khvichava, claimed world's oldest person (purportedly 132 years old at the time of her death in 2012).

References

Aleksandre Tsagareli (1880), Megrelskie Etiudi, Analiz Fonetiki Megrelskogo Yazika ("Megrelian Studies — The Analysis of Phonetics of Megrelian Language"). 
Ioseb Kipshidze (1914), Grammatika Mingrel’skogo (Iverskogo) Jazyka ("Grammar of Megrelian (Iverian) Language"). 
Shalva Beridze (1920), Megruli (Iveriuli) Ena ("Megrelian (Iverian) Language"). 
 Rusudan Amirejibi-Mullen, Nana Danelia and Inga Dundua (2006), kolkhuri (megrul-lazuri) ena (Tbilisi: Universali).
Laurence Broers (2012),"'Two Sons of One Mother'. Nested Identities and Centre-Periphery Politics in Post-Soviet Georgia". In Andreas Schonle, Olga Makarova and Jeremy Hicks (eds.), When the Elephant Broke Out of the Zoo. A Festschrift for Donald Rayfield ''(Stanford Slavic Studies, Volume 39). 
Otar Kajaia (2001-2002), Georgian-Mingrelian dictionary.
 Alio Kobalia (2010), Georgian-Mingrelian dictionary.

External links
TITUS Caucasica: Megrelisch 
Otar Kajaia's Megrelian-Georgian dictionary at TITUS.
Megrelian Project at Lund University, Sweden
Article on the situation in 2017 from OpenDemocracy

 
Agglutinative languages
Definitely endangered languages
Languages of Abkhazia
Languages of Georgia (country)